The Dardanian–Bastarnic war was a military conflict between the Kingdom of Dardania and the Bastarnae tribe.

History 
Philip V of Macedon planned to use the Bastarnae as a base to attack the Romans, but that required the Macedonians to settle in Dardania, along with their families, affecting the Dardanians as a people group. This would destroy long-time enemies of the Macedonian state and secure a path to Rome. Some twenty years before, Philip had lost a war against the Roman Republic, known as the Second Macedonian War. However, war was again threatened.

The Dardanians used every opportunity to loot Macedonia, and Philip's army was too weak at the time to attack them.

In 179 BC Philip died, just after the Bastarnae left their homeland. When they heard the news about Philip's death, the Bastarnae began moving through the Odrysian Kingdom. The Thracians felt that after the king's death, they were no longer under obligation to help and supply these barbarians. The Bastarnae started looting Odrysia in search for food. The Thracians made up an army, but they were weaker than the Bastarnae. The Bastarnae beat them and made them evacuate to hills and mountains. Thracian soldiers and families moved to Thracia's highest peak, Mt. Musala. The Bastarnae chased them, but when they reached the mountains, a heavy storm hit them and they retreated.

War 
Some 30,000 Bastarnae started moving to Dardania, while others returned home. They reached Dardania in autumn of 179 BC. 

The Bastarnae formed several camps. The Dardanians thought they were going to vanquish the enemy easily, but years passed and attackers were still there. In 176 BC Dardanian king Monunius II sent a delegation to Rome, accusing Macedonian king Perseus of invading the Bastarnae. Perseus wanted good relations with the Roman Republic, so he denied all accusations. 

The Dardanians waited to attack until the Bastarnae’s allies, the Scordisci and the Thracians, were busy working in the fields. They split into two groups; one to attack the front, and the other attacking from the flank. The first group arrived too early and was defeated. The Bastarnae pushed them and besieged them in their city. The other group of Dardanian soldiers were not aware of this, so they continued moving towards the enemy camp. The Bastarnae left their camp empty. Without their camp, they started retreating. On their way home they crossed the frozen river of the Danube. Ice started cracking and almost all Bastarnae soldiers died. Their leader, Clondicus, survived.

The Dardanians won the war, but they were heavily damaged and reduced in power. Dardania continued to exist until Roman conquest in 28 BC.

See also 
 Invasion of Molossia
 Macedonia (Dardanian puppet)

References 

Dardania (Roman province)
Wars involving the states and peoples of Europe
Bastarnae
Wars involving the Celts
Wars involving Germanic peoples